Vera Gornostayeva (October 1, 1929 – January 19, 2015) was a Russian pianist and pedagogue.

An Emeritus Artist of the Russian Federation at the time of her death, Gornostayeva was a graduate of the Moscow Tchaikovsky Conservatory, where her teacher was Heinrich Neuhaus.

Career 
In addition to her performing career, Gornostaeva was a professor at the Moscow Tchaikovsky Conservatory. She gave masterclasses in Italy, Germany, France, Switzerland, the United Kingdom, Japan and the United States. Her book Two Hours After the Concert was translated and published there.  Other educational activities included leading annual seminars for Russian music teachers, giving lectures on radio and TV on classical music and the performing arts, and publishing articles and books. She was a jury member and often chairman of the jury at many prestigious international music competitions, and was also the President of the Moscow Association of Musicians.

Gornostayeva was renowned for having trained about 50 prize winners of international piano competitions, including Alexander Slobodyanik, Semion Kruchin, Valery Sigalevitch, Petras Geniušas, Dina Joffe, Yuri Lisichenko, Pavel Egorov, Alexander Paley, Eteri Andjaparidze, Ivo Pogorelich, Irene Inzerillo,  Aleksandra Romanić, Sergei Babayan, Marian Pivka, Maxim Philippov, Vassily Primakov , Ayako Uehara, Maki Sekiya, Yurie Miura, Lukas Geniušas, Vadym Kholodenko, Stanislav Khristenko, Andrey Gugnin, Margarita Shevchenko.  and others.

She made numerous recordings for Melodiya, Philips, Phoenix, Yamaha, LP Classics, and other labels of piano works by Beethoven, Mozart, Brahms, Chopin, Debussy, Liszt, Schumann, Schubert, Scriabin, Tchaikovsky, Rachmaninov, Prokofiev, Shostakovich  and Mussorgsky. She died on January 19, 2015.

References

External links 
 http://www.classicalarchives.com/artist/4024.html#tv=about
 https://web.archive.org/web/20070707174321/http://www.mosconsv.ru/english/page.phtml?2139
 http://english.ruvr.ru/2009/10/05/1816218.html

1929 births
2015 deaths
Russian classical pianists
Russian women pianists
Moscow Conservatory alumni
20th-century classical pianists
Women classical pianists
20th-century women pianists
Soviet classical pianists